Hypomecis transcissa is a moth of the family Geometridae first described by Francis Walker in 1860. It is found in the Indian subregion and from Sri Lanka to Sundaland.

Host plants include Aleurites species.

References

Moths of Asia
Moths described in 1860